The King's Own Calgary Regiment (RCAC), (The King's Own or The KOCR), is a Canadian Army armoured reconnaissance regiment of the Canadian Armed Forces Primary Reserve. Headquartered at the Mewata Armoury in Calgary, Alberta, the KOCR is a part-time reserve unit of 3rd Canadian Division's 41 Canadian Brigade Group. Its regimental museum is located in Calgary.

The regiment operates the Textron Tactical Armoured Patrol Vehicle (TAPV), Mercedes-Benz G-Wagon and militarized Chevrolet Silverado trucks, known as the MILCOTS (or colloquially as the "Milverado").

Cap badge 
On a shield Argent a cross Gules surmounted by a maple leaf in autumnal tints charged with a bison statant on a mound, on a chief the local landscape at sunset all proper, the shield ensigned by the Royal Crown, supported dexter by a horse, sinister by a steer, adorned beneath with a rose between shamrocks and thistles all proper, the whole set upon three scrolls Or, the upper one inscribed with the motto ONWARD and the two below inscribed KING'S OWN CALGARY REGIMENT in letters Azure.

The Crown represents service to the Sovereign. The badge, incorporates the shield, the horse, the steer and the roses, thistles, and shamrocks, as adopted by the City of Calgary in 1902. "KING'S OWN CALGARY REGIMENT" is a form of the regimental title and "ONWARD" is the motto of the regiment and the City of Calgary.

Lineage 
The King's Own Calgary Regiment (Royal Canadian Armoured Corps) was split off in 1920 the 103rd Regiment (Calgary Rifles) raised on 10 April 1910 at Calgary, Alberta. The regiment was reorganized on 15 March 1920 as two separate regiments, The Alberta Regiment (now The South Alberta Light Horse) and The Calgary Regiment as part of the Otter Committee reorganizations. On 15 May 1924, The Calgary Regiment was again reorganized and split into two separate regiments, The Calgary Regiment (now The King's Own Calgary Regiment) and The Calgary Highlanders.

On 15 September 1921 The Calgary Regiment divided into six battalions, the 1st Battalion became the 1st Battalion, Calgary Highlanders, The Calgary Regiment. The 2nd Battalion, The Calgary Regiment later became the King's Own Calgary Regiment. The 3rd, 4th and 5th battalions were paper units that were never formed and disbanded in the 1936 reorganizations of the Militia.

On 15 May 1924, The Calgary Regiment reorganized as separate regiments.

The King's Own Calgary Regiment (RCAC): 

 1 April 1910: Organized as the 103rd Regiment "Calgary Rifles"
 15 March 1920: Reorganized as two separate regiments, The Alberta Regiment (now The South Alberta Light Horse) and The Calgary Regiment
 15 May 1924: Reorganized as two separate regiments, The Calgary Regiment (now The King's Own Calgary Regiment) and The Calgary Highlanders
 1 April 1936: Amalgamated with the 'Headquarters' and 'B Company' of the '13th Machine Gun Battalion, CMGC' retaining its designation.
 15 December 1936: Redesignated The Calgary Regiment (Tank)
 1 April 1941: Redesignated 14th (Reserve) Army Tank Battalion, (The Calgary Regiment (Tank))
 15 August 1942: Redesignated 14th (Reserve) Army Tank Regiment, (The Calgary Regiment (Tank)) 
 1 April 1946: Redesignated 14th Armoured Regiment (Calgary Regiment), RCAC
 22 July 1946: Redesignated 14th Armoured Regiment (King's Own Calgary Regiment)
 4 Feb 1949: Redesignated The King's Own Calgary Regiment (14th Armoured Regiment)
 19 May 1958: Redesignated The King's Own Calgary Regiment (RCAC)

13th Machine Gun Battalion, CMGC 

 Originated on 1 June 1919, in Edmonton, Alberta, as the 13th Machine Gun Brigade, CMGC
 Redesignated on 15 September 1924, as the 13th Machine Gun Battalion, CMGC
 Amalgamated on 1 April 1936, with The Calgary Regiment

Lineage chart

History

1910–1913
The history of The King's Own Calgary Regiment (RCAC) began on 1 April 1910, when its predecessor the 103rd Regiment (Calgary Rifles), an infantry regiment of the Canadian non-permanent militia, was authorized and formed at Calgary, Alberta, Canada, by General Order 38/10.

First World War and afterwards, 1914–1920 
With the outbreak of the First World War, the regiment was divided into several battalions for overseas service, which the King's Own perpetuate to this day. These battalions included the 50th, 89th and 137th, all of which saw service in Europe and were composed of men from central and southern Alberta.

The 50th Battalion (Calgary), CEF, an infantry battalion of the Canadian Expeditionary Force, was authorized on 7 November 1914 and trained in Calgary and Sarcee Camp.

The battalion arrived in France on 11 August 1916, where it fought as part of the 10th Canadian Infantry Brigade, 4th Canadian Division in France and Flanders until the end of the war. The battalion took part in the Battle of the Somme in October 1916, the Vimy Ridge in April 1917, and fought during the Battle of Passchendaele. During the Battle of Vimy Ridge, Pte. John George Pattison of the 50th Battalion CEF was awarded the Empire's highest award for gallantry, the Victoria Cross, for his heroic actions on 10 April 1917, storming a German machine-gun nest.

1920-1938 
During the conclusion of World War I, and the interwar years, the regiment changed roles and names several times, however, it has always maintained its ancestral home at Mewata Armoury in downtown Calgary. In 1924 the unit was titled "The Calgary Regiment". In 1936 it was one of a handful of infantry regiments selected to become an armoured unit. With this evolution, the name was changed to "The Calgary Regiment (Tank)".

World War II (1939–1942)

On 16 February 1941, the 14th Army Tank Battalion (Calgary Regiment) was mobilized at Mewata Barracks. When the Canadian Armoured Corps was created, the Calgary Regiment lost its status as an infantry regiment and transferred to the new corps. A reserve regiment remained in Calgary. The regiment was composed of 400 members of the reserve battalion, drawing also from reinforcement personnel from The Seaforth Highlanders of Canada and the Edmonton Regiment.  The original 'A' Squadron was drawn from Olds and district, 'B' Squadron from Stettler area, 'C' Squadron from Red Deer, and Headquarters from Calgary, High River, and Okotoks district.

In March 1941 the regiment moved to Camp Borden, becoming part of the 1st Army Tank Brigade, and in June 1941 sailed for Great Britain.  Matilda tanks were initially used on the Salisbury Plain, but these were replaced later in the year by the first manufactured Churchills.

The overseas unit trained on various vehicles in Canada and the United Kingdom, and in August 1942 took the Churchill tank into battle for the first time at Dieppe. During the battle, the battalion suffered casualties: two officers and eleven men were killed, 33 men and officers were wounded and taken prisoner with 143 other men; Only five of 181 men returned to England after the battle. A notable casualty was Lieutenant Colonel "Johnny" Andrews, who was killed in action.

Italian Campaign (1942-1944) 
In the spring of 1943, Lieutenant-Colonel C.H. Neroutsos took command of the regiment.  The new unit went to Sicily in 1943 with the First Canadian Army Tank Brigade, re-equipped with the Sherman tank.

On 3 September 1943, the regiment assaulted the beaches of Reggio Calabria to little resistance and moved northwards with notable engagements in Potenza, Motta Montecorvino and Campobasso while supporting the 1st Canadian Infantry Division.  On 21 November 1943, the regiment supported the 8th Indian Infantry Division in its assault against fierce German opposition on the Sangro River.  In December the regiment met stubborn opposition fighting for the Moro River and later Vino Ridge and the Ortona Crossroads.

On 11–12 May 1944 the regiment assaulted across the Gari River supporting the 19th Indian Brigade of the 8th Indian Division.  During this operation and the advance towards the Hitler Line the regiment sustained casualties numbering 16 officers, 40 other ranks, and 60 tank casualties.  An innovative use of a modified Sherman tank to carry a bridge across the Gari River is known as Kingsmill bridge by its inventor Captain T. Kingsmill's moniker.  Kingsmill was to receive the Military Cross for the action.  At this point Lieutenant-Colonel Neroutsos fell ill, and the regiment was taken over by Lieutenant-Colonel C.A. Richardson.

In June 1944 the Calgaries took part in the Battle of Lake Trasimeno in support of the British 4th Division, after which the Calgaries conducted a pursuit up the Chiani Valley until the Lydia Line was reached south of Arezzo.  By 3 August 1944, the regiment had advanced with the 8th Indian Division to the Arno River through country with remarkably poor tank going.

On 25 August 1944 the Calgaries made an assault crossing of the Arno River, east of Florence pushing into the Sieve Valley where the Gothic Line was assaulted in the "Marradi" sector in support of the 1/5 Gurkha Regiment.  Another miserably wet Italian winter was spent in the mountains.

Liberation of Holland (1945) 
In late February 1945 the regiment was moved to Leghorn and embarked to Marseilles, France, where it moved by rail to the North-West Europe theatre.  The regiment moved to the Reichswald Forest and on 12 April 1945 fought in the Second Battle of Arnhem, supporting the 49th (West Riding) Infantry Division to Ede, the Netherlands. The regiment's final actions of the Second World War were in support of the 1st Belgium Brigade in clearing the resistance between the Nederrijn and Waal Rivers.

When the overseas unit returned to Canada in 1945, it was disbanded, and the Calgary Regiment continued its service as a reserve armoured unit.

1945–1999

Until 1968 the unit trained on Sherman tanks when the vehicles were finally retired. In the 1980s, the new AVGP Cougar was introduced into service, mounting a 76 mm main armament with co-axial C6 general purpose machine gun. These vehicles were used for training until the 21st century. In addition to an active Cougar squadron, an armoured reconnaissance squadron also trained on Jeeps and later the Iltis vehicle, usually mounting a C5 GPMG, or later the C6 GPMG.

Members of the regiment continued the proud military tradition of the unit by volunteering for United Nations and NATO missions augmenting Canadian Armed Forces regular units on peacekeeping duties in Cyprus, Croatia, Bosnia, Congo, Golan Heights, and Darfur.

2000-Present

In 2006, the regiment turned in its Cougar AVGP vehicles suspending its training as an armoured regiment and taking on the role of armoured reconnaissance with the Mercedes G-Wagen, known in the Canadian Armed Forces (CAF) as the LUVW (Light Utility Vehicle Wheeled). Soldiers also conduct dismounted reconnaissance tasks and domestic operations (assistance during natural disasters such as floods, forest fires, and ice storms to name a few). Other soldiers conduct recruit training for new members of Calgary-based 41 Canadian Brigade Group units.

In addition to many soldiers having served on United Nations tours in Cyprus, Croatia, Bosnia, Congo, Golan Heights, and Darfur, members of the regiment volunteered on operational tours in Afghanistan.

Soldiers deploying on missions receive training on the full range of CAF vehicles including the Leopard C2, the TLAV, Coyote, the LAV III, and the Nyala (RG-31) armoured patrol vehicle.

Besides reconnaissance crewman and officers, soldiers of the regiment are also trained as mechanics, CIMIC operators, musicians (in the regimental brass and reed band), RMS clerks, and storesmen.

Canada's participation in the War in Afghanistan saw many soldiers from the regiment deploy in a variety of roles throughout the conflict. On 24 September 2007, the King's Own suffered its first combat fatality since the Second World War, when Cpl Nathan Hornburg was killed in action while serving in Kandahar province. Cpl Hornburg was posthumously awarded the "Mention in Dispatches" for his exemplary performance in combat. As a result of the unit's contribution to the War in Afghanistan, The King's Own were awarded the  battle honour in 2014, which the regiment now proudly displays on their guidon.

In 2017, the regiment added a detachment into the High River, Alberta area, which currently parades at the High River Regional Airport. The regiment's aim is to eventually grow this detachment into squadron-sized unit. The regiment is also actively recruiting in the Okotoks, and Turner Valley regions.

The regiment also assumed operational control of the 41 Canadian Brigade Group Influence Activities Company, composed of civil-military cooperation (CIMIC) and psychological operations (Psyops) trained personnel.

Since 2014, the unit has been increasingly training with civilian side-by-side all-terrain platforms, snowmobiles, and All-Terrain Vehicles, examining their utility during domestic operations and to supplement for rear echelon tasks. On 22 April 2018 the regiment unveiled the Textron Tactical Armoured Patrol Vehicle (TAPV) during the unit anniversary St. George's Day.

Alliances 
—The Duke of Lancaster's Regiment (King's Lancashire and Border)

Battle honours
In the list below, battle honours in capitals were awarded for participation in large operations and campaigns, while those in lowercase indicate honours granted for more specific battles. The battle honours written in bold are emblazoned on the regimental guidon.

First World War

Second World War

Southwest Asia

Victoria Crosses

Private John George Pattison, VC

Regimental Association
The regimental association of The King's Own Calgary Regiment is named The King's Own Calgary Regiment (50 CEF / 14 CTR) Association. The current association pulls roots from the 50/14 Veterans Association which was created by Second World War veterans upon their return home.

According to the association bylaws:"Anyone who at any time has served with The King’s Own Calgary Regiment, or any of its predecessor units (including those who have served with the Regiment on attachment), or who is related to a current or former serving member of the Regiment or any of its predecessor units, or who has served with a Cadet Corps supported by the Regiment, or who is a loyal supporter of The King’s Own Calgary Regiment, shall be eligible for membership in the Association."The name of the association reflects the perpetuation of both the 50th Battalion, CEF, and the 14th Armoured Regiment (The Calgary Regiment).

Monuments
Soldiers of the 50th Battalion who went missing in action are memorialized on the Menin Gate and the Vimy Memorial while all Calgary-area soldiers of the regiment who have been killed in the First World War, Second World War and Afghanistan will be listed on the Calgary Soldiers' Memorial.

Regimental Band
The regimental brass and reed band is an active reserve force band composed of volunteer members. It is currently one of two Primary Reserve bands in 41 Canadian Brigade Group and is the de facto military bands for the southern Alberta area. Established in 1910, it has taken part in many provincial events such as the Calgary Stampede and the St. George's Day parade. The band has the following ensembles:

Wind Ensemble
Brass Ensemble
Fanfare Team
Percussion Ensemble

These ensembles make up the 35 member band, which primarily performs as a concert and parade band in the community. It also performs at military and provincial functions.

Cadets

The King's Own Calgary Regiment affiliated cadet corps is based in Cochrane, Alberta, bearing the title 2512 Kings Own Calgary Regiment Cadet Corps. The corps was formed 26 April 1954 as King's Own Calgary Regiment (14th Armoured Regiment). The corps disbanded 1 January 1958. The corps was formed again on 1 November 1976 as the King's Own Calgary Regiment Cadet Corps, and continues to parade weekly during the training year.

See also
 The Canadian Crown and the Canadian Forces
 Clarence Gerhart

External links

King's Own Calgary Regiment Regimental Funds Foundation
YouTube Channel
Army Cadet History 2512 Page
The King's Own Calgary Regiment Band

Notes

References

King's Own Calgary Regiment
Armoured regiments of Canada
Military units and formations established in 1949
Military units and formations of Alberta